The Under My Spell Tour was the debut headlining concert tour by American recording artist Paula Abdul. The tour supports her second studio album Spellbound (1991). The tour began in October 1991 and ran for nearly 100 shows in North America, Australasia, and Asia.

Broadcasts and recordings
The shows at the Yokohama Arena in Japan were released as a live VHS video and Laser disc in 1993. The concerts aired on local television in Japan and on Disney channel in the United States. An edited version of the concert at the Jamsil Arena in Seoul, South Korea aired on Korean television.

Personnel
Drums: Sonny Emory
Guitar: Tony Maiden
Bass guitar: Sam Sims
Keyboards: Ming Freeman and Darrell Smith
Saxophone: Cleto Escobedo
Backing vocalist: Rasheeda Azar, Paula Brown and Ameerah Tatum
Dancers: Sybil Azur, Terry Beeman, Bill Bohl, Keith Diorio, Denise Holland, Tiger Martina, Nancy O'Meara and Nathan Prevost

Opening act
Color Me Badd 
Aftershock

Setlist
The following setlist was obtained from the concert held on August 1, 1992; at the Allentown Fairgrounds Grandstand in Allentown, Pennsylvania. It does not represent all shows for the duration of the tour.
"Spellbound"
"Straight Up"
"The Promise of a New Day"
"Vibeology"
"Opposites Attract"
"Will You Marry Me?"
"U"
"Blowing Kisses in the Wind"
"Rush Rush"
"(It's Just) The Way That You Love Me"
"Cold Hearted"
"Forever Your Girl"

On select dates, like the filmed show in Yokohama, "Alright Tonight" was played in the encore before "Forever Your Girl", while "Will You Marry Me?" was cut.

Tour dates

Festivals and other miscellaneous performances
This concert was a part of the "California Exposition and State Fair"
This concert was a part of the "Orange County Fair"
This concert was a part of "Summerfest"
This concert was a part of the "Great Allentown Fair"

Cancellations and rescheduled shows

Box office score data

References

External links
Under My Spell Live Fan Page
Paula Abdul Collection

Paula Abdul concert tours
1991 concert tours
1992 concert tours
Concert tours of Australia
Concert tours of Asia
Concert tours of North America